Coquitlam Centre could refer to:

Coquitlam Centre, a shopping mall in Coquitlam, British Columbia, Canada
Coquitlam Town Centre, the city centre region of Coquitlam
Coquitlam Central station, a transit station in Coquitlam